Mohammed Sadiq may refer to:
 Mohammed Sadiq (Guantanamo detainee 349) (born 1913)
 Mohammed Saduq (Guantanamo detainee 512) (born 1952)
 Mohammed Sadiq (diplomat), Pakistan's ambassador to Afghanistan
 Mohammed Sadiq Mamdani, a British social entrepreneur

See also
 Mohammed Ahmed Sadek (active 1937-1972), Egyptian soldier and defence minister